Rzhyshchiv urban hromada (Ukrainian: Ржищівська міська територіальна громада) is a hromada (territorial community) in Ukraine, in Obukhiv Raion of Kyiv Oblast. The administrative center is the city of Rzhyshchiv.

The area of the hromada is 430.1 square kilometres (166.06 sq mi), and the population is 

It was formed on June 12, 2020, by merging the city of oblast significance of Rzhyshchiv and the rural municipalities of Balyko-Shchuchynka, Hrebeni, Hrushiv, Kuzmyntsi, Malyi Bukryn, Pivtsi, Pii, Staiky, Stritivka, Velyki Pritsky and Yablunivka. In July 2020, Rzhyshchiv hromada was included into a newly formed Obukhiv Raion.

Settlements 
The hromada consists of 1 city (Rzhyshchiv) and 23 villages: Balyko-Shchuchynka, Vedmedivka, Velykyi Bukryn, Velyki Pritsky, Vyselka, Hrebeni, Hrushiv, Dibrivka, Dudari, Kuzmyntsi, Lypovyi Rih, Malyi Bukryn, Onatsky, Panikarcha, Pivtsi, Pii, Romashky, Staiky, Stritivka, Ulianyky, Khodoriv, Yushky and Yablunivka.

References 

Hromadas of Kyiv Oblast
2020 establishments in Ukraine